These are the following list of animated films aimed for teen and adult audiences, for those included PG-13, R-rated, and X-rated by the Motion Picture Association, as well as TV-14 and TV-MA rated by TeleVision Parental Guidelines.

History 
Adult animation films became popular in 1970s and onwards. Animerama is the first adult anime trilogy to be rated X for the first two films, as the first film of the trilogy is A Thousand and One Nights (1969), was a success in Japan while it fails at the U.S box-office revenue until Fritz the Cat, the first adult animated film in U.S production to be rated X by the MPAA in 1972, the same year as the second film of the trilogy rates the film rating, which came at box-office success independently in 1970s and was rating surrendered in 1990s due to unknown reasons and left unrated on home video releases.

Highest-grossing adult animated films

Highest-grossing adult animated films by animation type

Computer animation

Traditional animation (Japanese)

Traditional animation (U.S and international)

Stop-motion animation

Highest-grossing adult animated films by year

Highest-grossing adult animated films by timeline 
At least four adult traditional animations held the records of the highest at any year;

See also 
 Adult animation
 List of adult animated films
List of highest-grossing animated films
List of highest-grossing anime films
 List of highest-grossing R-rated films

References 

Adult animated films
Lists of animated films
Adult animated